Museum of the History of the Greek Costume is a special interest museum in Athens, Greece. It was inaugurated by the former Minister of Culture, Melina Mercouri, in 1988 and is part of the Lyceum Club of Greek Women, a non profit society founded in 1911.

The museum's collections include Greek traditional costumes, jewellery, reproductions of minoan, classic and Byzantine clothes, as well as porcelain dolls with Greek costumes.

References

External links
City of Athens / (in Greek)
Ministry of Culture and Tourism / (in Greek)
www.athensinfoguide.com

Museums in Athens
Greek clothing
Fashion museums
Museums established in 1988
1988 establishments in Greece